Eighteen in the Sun (also known as Beach Party-Italian Style) is a 1962 Italian teen comedy film directed by Camillo Mastrocinque.The movie was shot in Naples and in island of Ischia.

Cast 

Catherine Spaak
Gianni Garko
Lisa Gastoni
Luisa Mattioli
Gabriele Antonini
Fabrizio Capucci
Stelvio Rosi
Mario Brega
Franco Giacobini
Ignazio Leone
Oliviero Prunas
Giampiero Littera
Spiros Focás
Thea Fleming

References

External links

1962 films
1962 comedy films
Italian comedy films
Films directed by Camillo Mastrocinque
Films scored by Ennio Morricone
Films set in the Mediterranean Sea
1960s Italian films